Víctor Yoshimar Yotún Flores (born 7 April 1990) is a Peruvian professional footballer who plays for Peruvian Primera División club Sporting Cristal and the Peru national team. He can play as a left back, left winger, or defensive midfielder.

Club career

Early career
Yotún first began by playing at the age of 7 in the youth academy Academia Deportiva Cantolao until the age of 12.
 Then he joined the youth divisions of Circolo Sportivo Italiano for two seasons. Then the following years he was in the youth divisions of Deportivo Real FC, alongside Manuel Tejada. In 2007, he transferred to one of Peru's largest clubs, Sporting Cristal, and played in their youth team.

José Gálvez FBC
In January 2008 he was loaned out to José Gálvez FBC for the 2008 Descentralizado season. There Yotún made his professional debut on 5 March 2008 in the Torneo Descentralizado in an away league match against Coronel Bolognesi FC. He entered the match in the 46th minute for Renzo Guevara, and the match finished in a 1–1 draw. Yotún scored his first official goal on 9 March 2008 in a league match at home against Atlético Minero, which resulted in 1–0 win for his club.
He played his last game for José Gálvez FBC on 14 December 2008 in the last fixture of the season, which finished in a 2–2 draw at home against Universidad San Martin. He made a total of 28 league appearances and scored 3 goals in his first season in the Descentralizado. This contributed to his club José Gálvez avoiding relegation that season by finishing in 9th place, just 5 points above the relegation zone.

Sporting Cristal
In January 2009 Yotún returned to Sporting Cristal for the 2009 Descentralizado season.
He made his official debut for Sporting Cristal on 9 May 2009 in a league match at home against FBC Melgar. Making his debut at the San Martín de Porres Stadium, he entered the match in the 46th minute replacing Yancarlo Casas, and the match finished in a 2–1 win for Melgar.

Yotún played his 100th Descentralizado match for Cristal on 27 May 2012 in Round 15 away to Juan Aurich. He was also handed the captain's armband after Carlos Lobaton's red card in the 61st minute, but his side could not score the equaliser as the match finished in a 1–0 win for Aurich.

Malmö FF
On 27 January 2015 Swedish champions Malmö FF announced that they had signed Yotún on a three-year contract. He arrived in Malmö as a left back, where he played for the 2015 season. After becoming the third choice left back behind newly arrived Behrang Safari and Pa Konate during the 2016 season, Yotún was played at various midfield positions, where he excelled. Yotún emerged as a key player during the first half of the 2017 season, and was voted Malmö FF player of the month by the supporters in July.

Orlando City SC
Yotún signed for Orlando City of Major League Soccer on 4 August 2017. He made his debut on August 13 in a 3–1 defeat to New York Red Bulls. On September 28, Yotún scored his first goal for Orlando in a 6–1 win over New England Revolution, a game in which he also registered two assists. Yotún was selected as an All-Star in 2018.

Cruz Azul 
On 27 December 2018, Yotún was sold to Cruz Azul of Liga MX for $4 million.

Return to Sporting Cristal
On 8 March 2022, Yotún returned to Sporting Cristal.

International career
In 2011, Yotun's impressive performances for Sporting Cristal convinced the new Peru national team coach Sergio Markarian to call him up for the 2011 edition of Kirin Cup. Against Japan, he made his national team debut substituting Jesus Rabanal in the 62nd minute. Though on 9 September 2013 against Uruguay for the fight for 5th place in the CONMEBOL World Cup Qualification group, Yotun's performance was heavily criticized by Peruvians because of his expulsion during the game, which many argued had cost Peru's qualification into the tournament.

In 2015, Yotun was part of the team that finished 3rd in Copa América. He also featured in all three group games of the 2016 Centenario edition but was suspended on yellow card accumulation for Peru's quarter-finals loss to Colombia.

Yotun was part of the team that qualified for the 2018 World Cup after Peru finished 5th in CONMEBOL qualifying and beat New Zealand in a play-off. It was the first time the country had qualified in 36 years. He made the 23-man squad that traveled to Russia and featured in all three group games as Peru finished third in the group.

On 20 June 2021, he played his 100th match for Peru in a 2–1 win over Colombia in the 2021 Copa América.

Career statistics

Club

A.  Includes four appearances in Campeonato Carioca

International

International goals
As of match played 29 March 2022. Peru score listed first, score column indicates score after each Yotún goal.

Honours

Sporting Cristal
 Torneo Descentralizado: 2012, 2014

Malmö FF
 Allsvenskan: 2016, 2017

Cruz Azul
 Liga MX: Guardianes 2021
 Campeón de Campeones: 2021
 Supercopa MX: 2019
 Leagues Cup: 2019

Peru
 Copa América: runner-up 2019; third place 2011, 2015 ,fourth place 2021

Individual
 Torneo Descentralizado Left back of the Year: 2009
 MLS All-Star: 2018
Copa América Team of the Tournament: 2021

See also
 List of men's footballers with 100 or more international caps

References

External links
Malmö FF profile 

1990 births
Living people
Sportspeople from Callao
Peruvian footballers
Association football fullbacks
Association football wingers
Association football utility players
Academia Deportiva Cantolao players
Circolo Sportivo Italiano footballers
Sporting Cristal footballers
José Gálvez FBC footballers
CR Vasco da Gama players
Malmö FF players
Orlando City SC players
Cruz Azul footballers
Peruvian Primera División players
Campeonato Brasileiro Série A players
Allsvenskan players
Major League Soccer players
Designated Players (MLS)
Liga MX players
Peru international footballers
2011 Copa América players
2015 Copa América players
Copa América Centenario players
2018 FIFA World Cup players
2019 Copa América players
2021 Copa América players
FIFA Century Club
Peruvian expatriate footballers
Peruvian expatriate sportspeople in Brazil
Peruvian expatriate sportspeople in Sweden
Peruvian expatriate sportspeople in the United States
Peruvian expatriate sportspeople in Mexico
Expatriate footballers in Brazil
Expatriate footballers in Sweden
Expatriate soccer players in the United States
Expatriate footballers in Mexico